The Enchanted Hill is a 1926 American silent Western film directed by Irvin Willat and written by James Shelley Hamilton and Peter B. Kyne. The film stars Jack Holt, Florence Vidor, Noah Beery, Sr., Mary Brian, Richard Arlen, George Bancroft, and Ray Thompson. The film was released on January 18, 1926, by Paramount Pictures.

Plot
As described in a film magazine review, a young ranch owner on whose land is a fortune of which he is unaware, falls in love with his fair neighbor when she arrives to take charge of the property left her by an uncle. She secretly returns the man’s love, but is in doubt of him because he seems reckless and has many enemies. For a near killing the rancher’s cook is set on by a mob but is rescued by his employer. This incident gives rise to a series of desperate events in which the hero and the heroine several times narrowly escape death. In the end, their difficulties dissolve and the course of their love becomes smooth.

Cast

Preservation
With no prints of The Enchanted Hill located in any film archives, it is considered a lost film.

References

External links

 
 

1926 films
1926 Western (genre) films
Paramount Pictures films
Films directed by Irvin Willat
American black-and-white films
Lost American films
Lost Western (genre) films
1926 lost films
Silent American Western (genre) films
1920s English-language films
1920s American films